Ayogya is a 2018 Indian Kannada romantic comedy film directed by debutante S. Mahesh Kumar and produced by T. R. Chandrashekar. It stars Sathish Ninasam and Rachita Ram in the lead along with P. Ravishankar, Chikkanna, Saritha, and Sadhu Kokila among others in key supporting roles. The music is scored by Arjun Janya and cinematography is by Preetham Thegginamane.

The film, based on a rural theme, was shot in and around Mandya district in Karnataka. It was released on 17 August 2018 across Karnataka, and received average reviews from critics. The Hindi dubbing rights was sold prior to the release of the film.

Cast

Soundtrack

Arjun Janya was brought in to compose the soundtrack and score for the film. This marks the first collaboration of Janya with actor Sathish Ninasam. Folk singer Anthony Daasan was hired to record the title track. Director-lyricist Chethan Kumar penned the lyrics for all the songs. The single "Yenammi Yenammi" video was officially released by actor Dhruva Sarja.

Critical reception
Cinema Express wrote "Overall, with a rural backdrop that brings freshness, Ayogya is engaging, and keeps the audience in good spirits throughout". Times of India wrote "Debutant director Mahesh manages to impress in his first outing by churning a commercial potboiler with the right mix of comedy, catchy dialogues and action to make a it a perfect weekend watch".

References

External links

Ayogya info

2018 films
Indian romantic comedy films
2018 romantic comedy films
2018 masala films
2010s Kannada-language films
Films scored by Arjun Janya
Films shot in Karnataka